Munroa is a genus of New World plants in the grass family, native to North and South America.

 Species
 Munroa andina Phil. - Bolivia, Chile, Argentina
 Munroa argentina Griseb. - Bolivia, Chile, Argentina
 Munroa decumbens Phil. - Peru, Bolivia, Chile, Argentina
 Munroa mendocina Phil. - Argentina
 Munroa squarrosa (Nutt.) Torr. - western Canada, west-central United States, north-central Mexico (Chihuahua, Coahuila, Durango)

 formerly included
see Blepharidachne 
 Munroa benthamiana - Blepharidachne benthamiana

References

External links
 Grass Manual Genus Treatment
 Grassbase - The World Online Grass Flora

Chloridoideae
Poaceae genera
Bunchgrasses of North America
Bunchgrasses of South America
Grasses of Argentina
Grasses of the United States
Native grasses of California